In mathematics, a ternary equivalence relation is a kind of ternary relation analogous to a binary equivalence relation. A ternary equivalence relation is symmetric, reflexive, and transitive. The classic example is the relation of collinearity among three points in Euclidean space. In an abstract set, a ternary equivalence relation determines a collection of equivalence classes or pencils that form a linear space in the sense of incidence geometry. In the same way,  a binary equivalence relation on a set determines a partition.

Definition
A ternary equivalence relation on a set  is a relation , written , that satisfies the following axioms:
Reflexivity: .
(Therefore also .)

References

Mathematical relations
Incidence geometry
Projective geometry